Perennial veldtgrass is a common name for several species of grass in the genus Ehrharta which have become invasive in English speaking countries:

Ehrharta calycina, the invasive perennial veldtgrass of North America
Ehrharta erecta, the invasive perennial veldtgrass of Australia